The Sigma dp0 Quattro is a discontinued fixed-focal length APS-C digital point-and-shoot camera, announced by Sigma on February 10, 2015.

Like other cameras in the dp Quattro series, it features a 29-megapixel Foveon X3 sensor, but is said to produce images equivalent to that of a 39-megapixel bayer sensor camera.

The dp0 Quattro has the widest focal length compared to other models of the dp Quattro range, with a 35 mm equivalent focal length of 21mm.

Software

Sigma Photo Pro 

Postprocessing of raw X3F and JPEG of all digital Sigma cameras.

Version 6.x is a free download for Windows 7+ and macOS 10.7 (6.3.x). Actual Versions are 6.5.4 (Win 7+) and 6.5.5 (MacOSX 10.9+).

Reception 
PCMag called the dp0 Quattro a "niche product", due to its fixed wide angle lens, with some quirks such as its uncommon grip shape, slow processing and writing per capture and battery life, but praised it for the quality of images produced, with its superior sensor and lens, giving the dp0 Quattro a rating of 3.5 out of 5.

During the  show held in 2015, USA Today did a first impressions review of the dp0 Quattro, which mentioned that the improved sensor on the dp0 Quattro had "faster processing times", compared to older Foveon-based cameras, but still pales in speed compared to other cameras in the market at that time. The camera is described with low lens distortion despite its wide angle lens but with poor battery life, with a conclusion that the camera is "an endearingly oddball".

References

 http://www.dpreview.com/products/sigma/compacts/sigma_dp0q/specifications

dp0 Quattro